Ha!-Ha!-Ha! is the second album by British pop group Ultravox, at that time known as "Ultravox!", with an exclamation mark, as a nod to Neu!. Although the group would later achieve fame and commercial success with lead singer Midge Ure the band was, in 1977, led by singer/songwriter John Foxx who was accompanied by guitarist Stevie Shears, drummer Warren Cann, bassist Chris Cross and keyboard/violist Billy Currie.

Release
Ha!-Ha!-Ha! was released on 14 October 1977, and was accompanied by lead single "ROckwrok" backed with "Hiroshima Mon Amour", which was released eleven days earlier. Neither reached the pop charts, although Island Records continued to have faith in the band. As a consequence of the album's confusing typography – it is variously known as Ha!-Ha!-Ha!, Ha! Ha! Ha! and -ha!-ha!-ha!, the group decided to abandon their exclamation mark for subsequent releases.

Description

Whilst the group's first album had been a product of the David Bowie/Roxy Music-esque side of glam rock, their second was considerably more informed by the burgeoning punk movement, although it also marked the group's first widespread adoption of synthesisers and electronic production techniques. Money from the first album was used to improve the band's equipment, and funded the purchase of an ARP Odyssey and, most notably, a Roland TR-77 drum machine, which appeared on the album's final track, "Hiroshima Mon Amour". This song was the most indicative of the group's later synth-pop direction, and remains both a fan and critical favourite.<ref>
{{ cite web
 |url         = http://www.newtimesbpb.com/issues/2003-11-20/music/music2.html
 |title       = New Times''' The Quiet Man
 |author      = Stratton, Jeff
 |date        = 20 November 2003
 |url-status     = dead
 |archive-url  = https://web.archive.org/web/20041204165314/http://www.newtimesbpb.com/Issues/2003-11-20/music/music2.html
 |archive-date = 4 December 2004
 |df          = dmy-all
}}</ref>
It was performed on the group's 1978 Old Grey Whistle Test appearance and was covered by The Church on their 1999 covers album A Box of Birds and also by Jan Linton.

"ROckWrok" was the lead single. An unusually sensual paean to unrestrained sexuality, the song featured a chorus which began "come on, let's tangle in the dark/fuck like a dog, bite like a shark" and lyrics such as "the whole wide world fits hip to hip" – despite which, it apparently achieved airplay on BBC Radio 1 on account of Foxx's garbled vocal delivery and the song's punky guitars.

Other songs included "Fear in the Western World", which was also a punk number, with socially conscious references to contemporary global hot spots including Soweto and Ireland. "While I'm Still Alive", although subsequently regarded by the band as the album's weakest title, was particularly reminiscent of Sex Pistols, and specifically the vocal phrasing of John Lydon. "Fear in the Western World" also ended with a short burst of feedback – edited from a much longer take, in the manner of the Beatles' "Helter Skelter" – which segued into the quiet piano opening of "Distant Smile", which eventually developed into a conventional rock number, albeit using a similar vocal-synth fade as Pink Floyd's contemporaneous "Sheep". "Artificial Life" was reminiscent of Roxy Music's "In Every Dream Home A Heartache", with lyrics that examined suburban teenage life and tribes. "Hiroshima Mon Amour", featured the saxophone playing of C.C. from the band Gloria Mundi, and includes the Roland TR-77 drum machine working a modified bossa-nova preset by drummer Warren Cann, and foreshadowed the music both John Foxx and Ultravox were to make later, apart. In 2012, in an interview with peek-a-boo magazine, John Foxx agreed to say that it was the first synthpop/new-wave song in rock history: "I think no one else had done a song like that before", he said. This was the last album featuring original guitarist Stevie Shears, who left the band early 1978, after the forthcoming Ha!-Ha!-Ha!'' tour.

Track listing

Personnel
Ultravox!
Warren Cann – drums, vocals, rhythm machine on "Hiroshima Mon Amour"
Chris Cross – bass, vocals
Billy Currie – violas, keyboards, synthesiser
John Foxx – vocals, guitar on "Hiroshima Mon Amour"
Stevie Shears – guitar

Additional personnel
C.C. (from Gloria Mundi) – saxophone on "Hiroshima Mon Amour"

References 

1977 albums
Ultravox albums
Island Records albums
Albums produced by Steve Lillywhite